Moses ben Meir of Ferrara was a 13th-century Italian tosafist from Ferrara, Italy. He was a contemporary of Eleazar ben Samuel and Isaiah ben Mali. He is quoted three times as a tosafist in  Haggahot Maimuniyyot and is believed to have copied down several teachings of Judah HaNasi from Berakot.

References 

Tosafists
13th-century Italian rabbis
Religious leaders from Ferrara